One Day Silver, One Day Gold is the third album by the British synthpop band Blue October.

Track listing
 "It's Not Enough"
 "I Never Thought I'd See You Cry"
 "Un-done"
 "Free"
 "Nervous Energy"
 "Pushing"
 "Somewhere"
 "Are We The Reason?"
 "Nowhere"
 "The Soul Within
 "Supanova"
 "Light Over Dark"
 "The Soul Within" (Polarised Sustain Mix) 1
 "It's No Enough" (Modular Music Mix) 1
 "I Never Thought I'd See You Cry" (Nano Thought Control Mix) 1

 1 Bonus tracks

Personnel
 Ross Carter: Vocals
 Glen Wisbey: Keyboards & Programming
 Chris Taubert: Keyboards & Sampling
 Nic Johnston: Guitars

Details
1, 2, 3, 4, 5, 7, 8, 10, 11, 12 written by Glen Wisbey and Ross Carter 
6 written by Glen Wisbey
9 written by Glen Wisbey / Chris Taubert

Guitars by Nic Johnston 
Backing vocals on tracks 1, 7, 8 by Alexys B

Bonus tracks remixed by Glen Wisbey
Bonus tracks additional production Reza Udhin

All songs were written and recorded between October 2002 and October 2004

Singles
One single was released from the album.
 "Free" (2004)

Credits
Produced by Reza Udhin and Blue October UK

Recorded at The Safe, Essex
Mixed at Cryonica Studios, London

Review
The strong acoustic elements of this album are reminiscent of indie bands such as The Lightning Seeds or James and while this incorporating of a wider range of styles aids the music in standing out from the synthpop hordes it is then given more guts by a very modern rhythmic approach with Ross Carter's melodic vocal style providing the perfect accompaniment throughout, from the easy-going opener "It's Not Enough" (which, along with "Are We The Reason?" features backing vocals from Alexys B), the bustling "The Soul Within" or the infectious "I Never Thought I'd See You Cry".

For me, the highlights come in the shape of the harder-edged instrumentals "Pushing" & "Nowhere", both of which benefit from some fine musicianship, while the powerfully majestic chorus that graces "Somewhere" provides another memorable moment. And just to make sure the album doesn't miss out on that all-important club action are the three 'club mixes' at the end, all of which (by the band's own Glen Wisbey with help from Reza Udhin) make the most of the band's catchy style & benefit from the extra dynamic boost.

2005 albums
Blue October (British band) albums